Baishuitai is located in Baidi (白地村), a village between Lijiang and Shangri-La County in Sanba Township (三坝乡), Shangri-La County, Dêqên Tibetan Autonomous Prefecture, northwestern Yunnan province, China. Slightly north of Haba near the upper Yangtze river valley, it is noted for its natural mineral terraces.

Transportation

From Tiger Leaping Gorge
In October 2013, a daily bus ran between Tiger Leaping Gorge and Baishuitai at a price of 55 RMB. Tickets can be purchased at Tina's Guest House or Tibet Guest House. Taxis can be arranged, at a price of around 300 RMB.

From Shangri-la
In August 2013, there were two daily buses operating between Shangri-la and Baishuitai, one leaving Shangri-la at 9 am and one at 2 pm. The ticket price was 25 RMB. The journey of about 90 km lasts around 3 hours, because of the very difficult mountain road.

See also
Huanglong Scenic and Historic Interest Area, China
 List of villages in China

References

Villages in China
Geology of China
Geography of Dêqên Tibetan Autonomous Prefecture